Alden Jones (born June 5, 1972) is an American writer and educator. She is the author of memoirs The Wanting Was a Wilderness (2020) and The Blind Masseuse (2013) and the short story collection Unaccompanied Minors (2014). The Blind Masseuse was longlisted for the PEN/Diamonstein-Spielvogal Award for the Art of the Essay.

Life

Jones was born in New York City and raised in Montclair, New Jersey. Her mother is a publicist and her father is renowned golf course architect Rees Jones. In her third book The Wanting Was a Wilderness, Jones describes “escaping” from her upbringing in a “gray brick conservative stronghold” as the locus of the queer feminist ideology which informs her work. She graduated from Brown University, where she studied fiction under Edmund White, and received master’s degrees from Bennington College and New York University, where she was a University Fellow in fiction. Jones has traveled extensively, primarily as an educator, including as a visiting professor on Semester at Sea, as the director of several programs in Cuba and as a Cuban Culture Expert on Royal Caribbean Cruises, and for a year in Costa Rica as a volunteer elementary school English teacher for WorldTeach, which was the subject of her first published essay, “Lard is Good For You.”

Career

Jones's travel essay, "Lard is Good For You," appeared in the inaugural edition of Best American Travel Writing, edited by Bill Bryson. This essay became the first chapter in The Blind Masseuse: A Traveler's Memoir from Costa Rica to Cambodia (University of Wisconsin Press, 2013), a travelogue about Jones’s travels in Costa Rica, Bolivia, Nicaragua, Cuba, Vietnam, Cambodia, Burma, India, and Egypt. The Blind Masseuse explores exoticism and the ethics of traveling as an American abroad and was named Recommended Reading by PEN America and National Geographic and a Top Ten Travel Title of 2013 by Publishers Weekly. Unaccompanied Minors (New American Press, 2014), a collection of stories with adolescent protagonists, won the New American Fiction Prize and was named by the Star-Ledger's Jacqueline Cutler as one of the "Ten Best Books of 2014 by New Jersey Authors." Jones' third book, the critical memoir The Wanting Was a Wilderness: Cheryl Strayed’s Wild and the Art of Memoir (Fiction Advocate, 2020), is a hybrid nonfiction work that the Center for Fiction described as “an intertextual blend of criticism and personal memoir that highlights the importance of contemporary literary analysis.” Her short stories, essays, and criticism have appeared in New York Magazine, BOMB, The Boston Globe, AGNI, Prairie Schooner, Post Road, the Iowa Review, The Rumpus, and WBUR’s Cognoscenti.

Jones teaches at Emerson College in the departments of Writing, Literature and Publishing and the Marlboro Institute for Liberal Arts and Interdisciplinary Studies. Emerson College awarded her the Alan Stanzler Award for Excellence in Teaching in 2016. She is also on the faculty of the Newport MFA program at Salve Regina University, where she teaches fiction and nonfiction. For many years Jones was a trip leader and organizer for Putney Student Travel and was faculty on its early programs in Cuba. In 2016 she co-founded the Cuba Writers Program, a writing and travel program based in Havana and its environs.

Awards
 Fore Word Reviews IndieFab Book of the Year Award in Travel Essays for The Blind Masseuse
 Independent Publisher Book Awards in Travel Essays for The Blind Masseuse
 PEN/Diamonstein-Spielvogel Award for the Art of the Essay longlist for The Blind Masseuse
 New American Fiction Prize for Unaccompanied Minors
 Independent Publisher Book Awards in Short Fiction for Unaccompanied Minors
 Lambda Literary Award for Debut Fiction finalist for Unaccompanied Minors
 Edmund White Award for Debut Fiction finalist for Unaccompanied Minors
 Lascaux Book Prize for Unaccompanied Minors
Lambda Literary Award for Bisexual Nonfiction finalist for The Wanting Was a Wilderness
Marion and Jasper Whiting Foundation Fellowship

Bibliography
 The Blind Masseuse: A Traveler's Memoir from Costa Rica to Cambodia (2013)
 Unaccompanied Minors (2014)
The Wanting Was a Wilderness: Cheryl Strayed’s Wild and the Art of Memoir (2020)

References

American women short story writers
American short story writers
Brown University alumni
Living people
1972 births
American memoirists
American travel writers
American LGBT writers
American women memoirists
21st-century LGBT people
21st-century American women